Johannes Nicolaas van 't Schip (born 30 December 1963) is a Dutch Canadian and former Dutch international footballer, who played as a winger. He spent his club career with Ajax, where they won four Eredivisie titles, a UEFA Cup and a European Cup Winners Cup, as well as Genoa. He was also a member of the Dutch side which won the 1988 European Championships.

Van 't Schip last managed the Greece national football team, a role he had since July 2019. He previously was the manager of PEC Zwolle in his native Netherlands and Melbourne City FC in Australia among others.

Early life
Van 't Schip was born in Fort St. John, British Columbia, and was raised in Powell River, British Columbia, where he grew up playing youth football in the small community before his family moved back to the Netherlands in 1972.

Club career
Van 't Schip began his career in the Ajax youth academy. Debuting for the first team 6 December 1981 (Ajax-Haarlem 4–1), he spent the next 11 seasons with the club. During this period he became league champion in 1982, 1983, 1985, and 1990, and cup champion in 1983, 1986 and 1987. He also helped Ajax win the 1987 European Cup Winners' Cup and the 1992 UEFA Cup. After Ajax's UEFA Cup victory, he was bought by Italian team Genoa, where he played four seasons before finishing his career. He helped the club to lift the 1996 Anglo-Italian Cup.

International career
On the international level, Van 't Schip, a member of the Dutch squad at the 1983 FIFA World Youth Championship, was capped 41 times and scored two goals for the Dutch national team. His debut came against Scotland in April 1986, and his final match was a Euro qualifying match against Belarus in June 1995. Van 't Schip featured in the victorious Euro 1988 squad, as well as 1990 FIFA World Cup and Euro 1992 tournaments.

Coaching career
After retiring, Van 't Schip became a youth coach for Ajax and manager for FC Twente. From August 2004 he assisted Marco van Basten in coaching the Dutch national team, until Van Basten left the position of head coach following Euro 2008. Van 't Schip followed Van Basten to Ajax, becoming assistant coach with Rob Witschge, for the 2008–09 season. On 6 May 2009, after Marco van Basten's resignation, he was named as the interim head coach of Ajax and coached the club till the end of the season.

Melbourne Heart
He was signed by Australian A-League club Melbourne Heart on 12 October 2009, to be their inaugural coach for the 2010–11 season. On 1 February 2012, Van 't Schip announced that he would be leaving the Melbourne Heart at the end of the 2011–12 season, citing personal reasons for his decision. Van't Schip took Heart to their first finals appearance in their second season. Van 't Schip had a major role in the development of Melbourne Heart.

Guadalajara
In April 2012, Guadalajara announced, through its Twitter account, that Van 't Schip would be the new coach of the club. Van 't Schip was recommended by his fellow countryman Johan Cruyff, who was working at that moment in a project with the club. Van 't Schip's first competitive game was against Toluca, in which the Chivas lost 2–1.

Van 't Schip was relieved of his duties as coach of Chivas a few days before the start of the Clausura 2013 Season. He was replaced by former Chivas coach Benjamin Galindo.

Return to Melbourne City
On 30 December 2013, following 17 winless games by Melbourne Heart and the early termination of John Aloisi's contract, Melbourne Heart appointed Van 't Schip as the coach until the end of the season.

On 19 March 2014, after 11 matches coaching the club, including a seven-match unbeaten run, Van 't Schip signed a three-year contract with the club (who would be renamed Melbourne City FC in June 2014), through to the end of the 2016–17 season.

On 3 January 2017, Van 't Schip resigned as Melbourne City manager to return to the Netherlands to help care for his terminally-ill father.

Greece
In July 2019, he was hired as coach of Greece national football team. On 26 November 2021 Van 't Schip resigned as Greece national football team coach.

Personal life
In addition to his native Dutch, Van 't Schip can also speak English, Spanish  and Italian.

Coaching record

1.Includes League, Liguilla, Copa MX and CONCACAF Champions League.

Honours

Player

Club
Ajax
Eredivisie: 1981–82, 1982–83, 1984–85, 1989–90
KNVB Cup: 1982–83, 1985–86, 1986–87
UEFA Cup: 1991–92
European Cup Winners' Cup: 1986–87

Genoa
Anglo-Italian Cup: 1995–96

International
Netherlands
UEFA European Championship: 1988

Manager
Melbourne City FC
FFA Cup: 2016

References

External links
knvb.nl 
ajax.nl 

1963 births
Living people
1990 FIFA World Cup players
AFC Ajax players
Canadian emigrants to the Netherlands
Canadian people of Dutch descent
Dutch football managers
Dutch expatriate footballers
Dutch footballers
Eredivisie players
Expatriate footballers in Italy
Van 'T Schip, John
Netherlands youth international footballers
Netherlands international footballers
People from Fort St. John, British Columbia
Serie A players
Serie B players
UEFA Euro 1988 players
UEFA Euro 1992 players
UEFA European Championship-winning players
Dutch expatriate sportspeople in Italy
FC Twente managers
Jong Ajax managers
Eredivisie managers
Van 'T Schip, John
C.D. Guadalajara managers
Greece national football team managers
Dutch expatriate football managers
Expatriate football managers in Mexico
AFC Ajax managers
AFC Ajax non-playing staff
Melbourne City FC managers
Dutch expatriate sportspeople in Australia
Dutch expatriate sportspeople in Mexico
Association football wingers
UEFA Cup winning players